Appu Ghar is a one million square foot, beach-themed, water park in Gurgaon in the Indian state of Haryana. It consists of 15 water rides and banquet facilities for up to 2,000 guests. It is owned by EOD Amusement Pvt. Limited and opened in 2014. The park is named after the original Appu Ghar amusement park of the company in nearby Delhi, which closed down in 2008.

Rides at the water park

 Sky Fall: A 92-foot free fall drop. It is listed in the Limca Book of Records 2010 as the tallest water ride in India.
Aqua Loop aka OMG - Oh My Gurgaon: Has vertical height of 20m (65.6168 feet) and 2.5 gravities of acceleration in two seconds. Speeds reach 60 km/h (37.282132538 mph) for a duration of 5 seconds.
Wave Pool: An artificial beach with large waves.
Open Float Slide aka Whirl Wind: A float slide with twists and turns.
Crazy River: A 200m long water coaster.
Rapid Racer: A 4 Lane Racer Water Ride. Guests challenge each other for a race.
 Thunderstorm: A float slide with twists and turns and drops.
Play Station aka Pirate Station: A 16 platform station with different water rides and a pool.
Lazy River: Crosses the park with slow flowing water.

Restaurants
The theme park has 5 restaurants that offer variety of food options to the visitors.
 Low Tide Buffet Restro: A ship themed restaurant located on Wave Pool. Cuisines include Italian, Asian, Chinese, North Indian and Continental with drinks.
 Rice In The Bowl: Rice with chana/rajma/kadhi
 Oysters Bread Co.: Cakes, breads and bespoke desserts, tarts and muffins

 Crazy River Food Court: Cuisines ranging from Indian, Oriental, Continental, simple beach/street food with cocktails and mocktails
 Dimsum Cart: Vegetarian and non-vegetarian dumplings
 Hi – Tide Bar: A Bar and grill
 Liquid Dukan: Bar

Recognition 
 Right Choice Award 2016.
 National Record 2014 for Tallest Water Ride.

References

External links
 Official Website of Appu Ghar Water Park

Amusement parks in India
Water parks in India
Buildings and structures in Gurgaon
2014 establishments in Haryana
Tourist attractions in Haryana
Amusement parks opened in 2014